A lentigo (plural lentigines) is a small pigmented spot on the skin with a clearly defined edge, surrounded by normal-appearing skin. It is a harmless (benign) hyperplasia of melanocytes which is linear in its spread. This means the hyperplasia of melanocytes is restricted to the cell layer directly above the basement membrane of the epidermis where melanocytes normally reside. This is in contrast to the "nests" of multi-layer melanocytes found in moles (melanocytic nevi). Because of this characteristic feature, the adjective "lentiginous" is used to describe other skin lesions that similarly proliferate linearly within the basal cell layer.

Diagnosis

Conditions characterized by lentigines include:

 Lentigo simplex
 Solar lentigo (Liver spots)
 PUVA lentigines
 Ink spot lentigo
 LEOPARD syndrome
 Mucosal lentigines
 Multiple lentigines syndrome
 Moynahan syndrome
 Generalized lentiginosis
 Centrofacial lentiginosis
 Carney complex
 Inherited patterned lentiginosis in black persons
 Partial unilateral lentiginosis
 Peutz–Jeghers syndrome
 Lentigo maligna
 Lentigo maligna melanoma
 Acral lentiginous melanoma

Differential diagnosis
Lentigines are distinguished from freckles (ephelis) based on the proliferation of melanocytes. Freckles have a relatively normal number of melanocytes but an increased amount of melanin. A lentigo has an increased number of melanocytes. Freckles will increase in number and darkness with sunlight exposure, whereas lentigines will stay stable in their color regardless of sunlight exposure.

Treatment
Lentigines by themselves are benign, however one might desire the removal or treatment of some of them for cosmetic purposes. In this case they can be removed surgically, or lightened with the use of topical depigmentation agents. Some common depigmentation agents such as azelaic acid and kojic acid seem to be inefficient in this case, however other agents might work well (4% hydroquinone, 5% topical cysteamine, 10% topical ascorbic acid).

See also 
 Freckle
 List of skin diseases
 Mole
 Skin disease
 Skin lesion

References

External links 

 

Melanocytic nevi and neoplasms
Disturbances of human pigmentation